Auguste Maneff Taneff (1916 – 23 May 1960), known as Boris Maneff, was a Swiss amateur tennis player in the 1930s and 1940s. 

He was born in Geneva to a Bulgarian father, Kyril Manev Tanev (and French mother, Marie Purnot, from Metz. He also played high-level field hockey, ice hockey and football.

Maneff was a virtual unknown in the world of international tennis before entering the 1936 French Championships in Paris, where he reached the quarterfinals. He put up a serious challenge to defending champion Fred Perry, who finally defeated him in four sets, 9–7, 6–3, 4–6, 6–3.

References

External links

1916 births
1960 deaths
Swiss male tennis players
Date of birth missing
Swiss people of French descent
Swiss people of Bulgarian descent
Tennis players from Geneva